Yegor Igorevich Prutsev (born 23 December 2002) is a Russian football player who plays for Red Star Belgrade.

Club career
He made his debut in the Russian Premier League for PFC Sochi on 26 September 2020 in a game against FC Krasnodar.

On 16 June 2021, he joined FC Tekstilshchik Ivanovo on loan for the 2021–22 season. On 16 February 2022, Prutsev moved on a new loan to FC Neftekhimik Nizhnekamsk.

On 11 August 2022, he joined Serbian powerhouse Red Star Belgrade on a four-years-long contract.

Personal life
His older brother Danil Prutsev is also a footballer.

References

External links
 
 
 

2002 births
Living people
Russian footballers
Russia under-21 international footballers
Association football midfielders
PFC Sochi players
FC Tekstilshchik Ivanovo players
FC Neftekhimik Nizhnekamsk players
Red Star Belgrade footballers
Russian Premier League players
Russian First League players
Russian expatriate footballers
Expatriate footballers in Serbia
Russian expatriate sportspeople in Serbia